Gladys Caroline Barron née Logan (1884–1967) was an English sculptor and painter renowned for her portraiture.

Personal life 
Barron was born in Bengal, India, to Ismay Bellew Adams and Maxwell Beckett Logan. She returned to England during childhood, spending some early years in St Albans and studying in London before moving to Scotland.

Logan studied under Gertrude Bayes (née Smith) at the St John's Wood Art School in London. She married Evan Barron (1879–1965), historian and owner and editor of The Inverness Courier newspaper. They lived at Westerlea House, owned by Gladys Barron until her death in 1967 when it was bought and converted into a hotel.

Artwork 
Barron exhibited regularly at the Royal Scottish Academy from 1925 to 1964. From 1946 to 1953 she exhibited at the Royal Glasgow Institute of the Fine Arts. Barron was also a regular exhibitor at the Royal Academy, exhibiting from at least 1931 with the bronze bust William Lawrence, Esq. to 1959 with Jawi, North Borneo, also a bronze bust. Barron may have exhibited at the Royal Academy from 1912 with the bronze sculpture Echo under her maiden name, 'G. Logan'.

Gladys Barron was the first President of the Art Society of Inverness upon its founding in 1944.

Works held in public collections

References

External links 
 

1884 births
1967 deaths
20th-century British women artists
Alumni of St John's Wood Art School
British women sculptors
British people in colonial India